Charlie Chan is a fictional Honolulu police detective created by author Earl Derr Biggers for a series of mystery novels.  Biggers loosely based Chan on Hawaiian detective Chang Apana. The benevolent and heroic Chan was conceived as an alternative to Yellow Peril stereotypes and villains like Fu Manchu. Many stories feature Chan traveling the world beyond Hawaii as he investigates mysteries and solves crimes.

Chan first appeared in Biggers' novels and then was featured in a number of media. Over four dozen films featuring Charlie Chan were made, beginning in 1926. The character, featured only as a supporting character, was first portrayed by East Asian actors, and the films met with little success. In 1931, for the first film centering on Chan, Charlie Chan Carries On, the Fox Film Corporation cast Swedish actor Warner Oland; the film became popular, and Fox went on to produce 15 more Chan films with Oland in the title role. After Oland's death, American actor Sidney Toler was cast as Chan; Toler made 22 Chan films, first for Fox and then for Monogram Studios. After Toler's death, six films were made, starring Roland Winters.

Readers and moviegoers of America greeted Chan warmly. Chan was seen as an attractive character, portrayed as intelligent, heroic, benevolent, and honorable; this contrasted the common depiction of Asians as evil or conniving which dominated Hollywood and national media in the early 20th century. However, in later decades critics increasingly took a more ambivalent view of the character. Despite his good qualities, Chan was also perceived as reinforcing condescending Asian stereotypes such as an alleged incapacity to speak idiomatic English and a tradition-bound and subservient nature. No Charlie Chan film has been produced since 1981.

The character has also been featured in several radio programs, two television shows, and comics.

Books 
The character of Charlie Chan was created by Earl Derr Biggers. In 1919, while visiting Hawaii, Biggers planned a detective novel to be called The House Without a Key. He did not begin to write that novel until four years later, however, when he was inspired to add a Chinese-American police officer to the plot after reading in a newspaper of Chang Apana and Lee Fook, two detectives on the Honolulu police force. Biggers, who disliked the Yellow Peril stereotypes he found when he came to California, explicitly conceived of the character as an alternative: "Sinister and wicked Chinese are old stuff, but an amiable Chinese on the side of law and order has never been used."

The "amiable Chinese" made his first appearance in The House Without a Key (1925). The character was not central to the novel and was not mentioned by name on the dust jacket of the first edition. In the novel, Chan is described as "very fat indeed, yet he walked with the light dainty step of a woman" and in The Chinese Parrot as being " … an undistinguished figure in his Western clothes. According to critic Sandra Hawley, this description of Chan allows Biggers to portray the character as nonthreatening, the opposite of evil Chinese characters, such as Fu Manchu, while simultaneously emphasizing supposedly Chinese characteristics such as impassivity and stoicism.

Biggers wrote six novels in which Charlie Chan appears:
The House Without a Key (1925)
The Chinese Parrot (1926)
Behind That Curtain (1928)
The Black Camel (1929)
Charlie Chan Carries On (1930)
Keeper of the Keys (1932)

Film, radio, stage and television adaptations

Films 
The first film featuring Charlie Chan, as a supporting character, was The House Without a Key (1926), a ten-chapter serial produced by Pathé Studios, starring George Kuwa, a Japanese actor, as Chan. A year later Universal Pictures followed with The Chinese Parrot, starring Japanese actor Kamiyama Sojin as Chan, again as a supporting character. In both productions, Charlie Chan's role was minimized. Contemporary reviews were unfavorable; in the words of one reviewer, speaking of The Chinese Parrot, Sojin plays "the Chink sleuth as a Lon Chaney cook-waiter … because Chaney can't stoop that low."

For the first film to center mainly on the character of Chan, Warner Oland, a white actor, was cast in the title role in 1931's Charlie Chan Carries On, and it was this film that gained popular success. Oland, a Swedish actor, had also played Fu Manchu in an earlier film. Oland, who claimed some Mongolian ancestry, played the character as more gentle and self-effacing than he had been in the books, perhaps in "a deliberate attempt by the studio to downplay an uppity attitude in a Chinese detective." Oland starred in sixteen Chan films for Fox, often with Keye Luke, who played Chan's "", Lee Chan. Oland's "warmth and gentle humor" helped make the character and films popular; the Oland Chan films were among Fox's most successful. By attracting "major audiences and box-office grosses on a par with A's" they "kept Fox afloat" during the Great Depression.

Oland died in 1938, and the Chan film Charlie Chan at the Ringside was rewritten with additional footage as Mr. Moto's Gamble, an entry in the Mr. Moto series, another contemporary series featuring an East Asian protagonist; Luke appeared as Lee Chan, not only in already shot footage but also in scenes with Moto actor Peter Lorre. Fox hired another white actor, Sidney Toler, to play Charlie Chan, and produced eleven Chan films through 1942. Toler's Chan was less mild-mannered than Oland's, a "switch in attitude that added some of the vigor of the original books to the films." He is frequently accompanied, and irritated, by his Number Two Son, Jimmy Chan, played by Victor Sen Yung, who later portrayed "Hop Sing" in the long-running Western television series Bonanza.

When Fox decided to produce no further Chan films, Sidney Toler purchased the film rights. Producers Philip N. Krasne and James S. Burkett of Monogram Pictures produced and released further Chan films starring Toler. The budget for these films was reduced from Fox's average of $200,000 to $75,000. For the first time, Chan was portrayed on occasion as "openly contemptuous of suspects and superiors." African-American comedic actor Mantan Moreland played chauffeur Birmingham Brown in 13 films (1944–1949) which led to criticism of the Monogram films in the forties and since; some call his performances "brilliant comic turns", while others describe Moreland's roles as an offensive and embarrassing stereotype. Toler died in 1947 and was succeeded by Roland Winters for six films. Keye Luke, missing from the series after 1938's Mr. Moto rework, returned as Charlie's son in the last two entries.

Spanish-language adaptations 

Three Spanish-language Charlie Chan films were made in the 1930s and 1950s. The first, Eran Trece (There Were Thirteen, 1931), is a multiple-language version of Charlie Chan Carries On (1931). The two films were made concurrently and followed the same production schedule, with each scene filmed twice the same day, once in English and then in Spanish. The film followed essentially the same script as the Anglophonic version, with minor additions such as brief songs and skits and some changes to characters' names (for example, the character Elmer Benbow was renamed Frank Benbow). A Cuban production, La Serpiente Roja (The Red Snake), followed in 1937. In 1955, Producciones Cub-Mex produced a Mexican version of Charlie Chan called El Monstruo en la Sombra (Monster in the Shadow), starring Orlando Rodriguez as "Chan Li Po" (Charlie Chan in the original script). The film was inspired by La Serpiente Roja as well as the American Warner Oland films.

Chinese-language adaptations 

During the 1930s and 1940s, five Chan films were produced in Shanghai and Hong Kong. In these films, Chan, played by Xu Xinyuan (徐莘园),  owns his detective agency and is aided not by a son but by a daughter, Manna, played first by Gu Meijun (顾梅君) in the Shanghai productions and then by Bai Yan (白燕) in postwar Hong Kong.

Chinese audiences also saw the original American Charlie Chan films. They were by far the most popular American films in 1930s China and among Chinese expatriates; "one of the reasons for this acceptance was that this was the first time Chinese audiences saw a positive Chinese character in an American film, a departure from the sinister East Asian stereotypes in earlier movies like Thief of Baghdad (1924) and Harold Lloyd's Welcome Danger (1929), which incited riots that shut down the Shanghai theater showing it." Oland's visit to China was reported extensively in Chinese newspapers, and the actor was respectfully called "Mr. Chan".

Modern adaptations 

In Neil Simon's Murder By Death, Peter Sellers plays a Chinese detective called Sidney Wang, a parody of Chan.

In 1980, Jerry Sherlock began production on a comedy film to be called Charlie Chan and the Dragon Lady. A group calling itself C.A.N. (Coalition of Asians to Nix) was formed, protesting the fact that non-Chinese actors, Peter Ustinov and Angie Dickinson, had been cast in the primary roles. Others protested that the film script contained a number of stereotypes; Sherlock responded that the film was not a documentary. The film was released the following year as Charlie Chan and the Curse of the Dragon Queen and was an "abysmal failure." An updated film version of the character was planned in the 1990s by Miramax. While this Charlie Chan was to be "hip, slim, cerebral, sexy and... a martial-arts master," and portrayed by actor Russell Wong, nonetheless the film did not come to fruition. Actress Lucy Liu was slated to star in and executive-produce a new Charlie Chan film for Fox. The film was in preproduction since 2000. As of 2009 it is slated to be produced, but as of 2020 it has not been made.

Radio

On radio, Charlie Chan was heard in several different series on three networks (the NBC Blue Network, Mutual, and ABC) between 1932 and 1948 for the 20th Century Fox Radio Service. Walter Connolly initially portrayed Chan on Esso Oil's Five Star Theater, which serialized adaptations of Biggers novels. Ed Begley, Sr. had the title role in N.B.C.'s The Adventures of Charlie Chan (1944–45), followed by Santos Ortega (1947–48). Leon Janney and Rodney Jacobs were heard as Lee Chan, Number One Son, and Dorian St. George was the announcer. Radio Life magazine described Begley's Chan as "a good radio match for Sidney Toler's beloved film enactment."

Stage 
Valentine Davies wrote a stage adaptation of novel Keeper of the Keys for Broadway in 1933, with William Harrigan as the lead. The production ran for 25 performances.

Television adaptations 

 In 1956–57, The New Adventures of Charlie Chan, starring J. Carrol Naish in the title role, were made independently for TV syndication in 39 episodes, by Television Programs of America. The series was filmed in England. In this series, Chan is based in London rather than the United States. Ratings were poor, and the series was canceled.
 In the 1960s, Joey Forman played an obvious parody of Chan named "Harry Hoo" in two episodes of Get Smart.
 In the 1970s, Hanna-Barbera produced an animated series called The Amazing Chan and the Chan Clan. Keye Luke, who had played Chan's son in many Chan films of the 1930s and '40s, lent his voice to Charlie, employing a much-expanded vocabulary; Luke thus became the first actual Chinese person to portray Chan on screen. (The title character bears some resemblance to the Warner Oland depiction of Charlie Chan.) The series focused on Chan's children, played initially by East Asian-American child actors before being recast, due to concerns that younger viewers would not understand the accented voices.  Leslie Kumamota voiced Chan's daughter Anne, before being replaced by Jodie Foster.
 The Return of Charlie Chan, a television film starring Ross Martin as Chan, was made in 1971 but did not air until 1979.

Comics and games 

A Charlie Chan comic strip, drawn by Alfred Andriola, was distributed by the McNaught Syndicate beginning October 24, 1938. Andriola was chosen by Biggers to draw the character. Following the Japanese attack on Pearl Harbor, the strip was dropped; the last strip ran on May 30, 1942. In 2019, The Library of American Comics reprinted one year of the strip (1938) in their  LoAC Essentials line of books.

Over decades, other Charlie Chan comic books have been published: Joe Simon and Jack Kirby created Prize Comics' Charlie Chan (1948), which ran for five issues. It was followed by a Charlton Comics title which continued the numbering (four issues, 1955). DC Comics published The New Adventures of Charlie Chan, a 1958 tie-in with the TV series; the DC series lasted for six issues. Dell Comics did the title for two issues in 1965. In the 1970s, Gold Key Comics published a short-lived series of Chan comics based on the Hanna-Barbera animated series. In March through August 1989 Eternity Comics/Malibu Graphics published Charlie Chan comic books numbers 1 - 6 reprinting daily strips from January 9, 1939 to November 18, 1939.

In addition, a board game, The Great Charlie Chan Detective Mystery Game (1937), and a Charlie Chan Card Game (1939), have been released.

On May 21, 2020 game developers Play'n GO released Charlie Chance in Hell to Pay for desktop and mobile browsers. This is not an officially branded game, however, the game's main character Charlie Chance is directly based on the original Charlie Chan character, sharing a similar name, trademark moustache and sharp dress sense. This game was followed by two sequels in 2021, Charlie Chance XREELZ and Charlie Chance and the Curse of Cleopatra.

Modern interpretations and criticism 

The character of Charlie Chan has been the subject of controversy. Some find the character to be a positive role model, while others argue that Chan is an offensive stereotype. Critic John Soister argues that Charlie Chan is both; when Biggers created the character, he offered a unique alternative to stereotypical evil Chinamen, a man who was at the same time "sufficiently accommodating in personality... unthreatening in demeanor... and removed from his Asian homeland... to quell any underlying xenophobia."

Critic Michael Brodhead argues that "Biggers's sympathetic treatment of the Charlie Chan novels convinces the reader that the author consciously and forthrightly spoke out for the Chinese – a people to be not only accepted but admired. Biggers's sympathetic treatment of the Chinese reflected and contributed to the greater acceptance of Chinese-Americans in the first third of [the twentieth] century." S. T. Karnick writes in the National Review that Chan is "a brilliant detective with understandably limited facility in the English language [whose] powers of observation, logic, and personal rectitude and humility made him an exemplary, entirely honorable character." Ellery Queen called Biggers's characterization of Charlie Chan "a service to humanity and to inter-racial relations." Dave Kehr of The New York Times said Chan "might have been a stereotype, but he was a stereotype on the side of the angels." Keye Luke, an actor who played Chan's son in a number of films, agreed; when asked if he thought that the character was demeaning to the race, he responded, "Demeaning to the race? My God! You've got a Chinese hero!" and "[W]e were making the best damn murder mysteries in Hollywood."

Other critics, such as sociologist Yen Le Espiritu and Huang Guiyou, argue that while Chan is portrayed positively in some ways, is not on a par with white characters, but a "benevolent Other" who is "one-dimensional." The films' use of white actors to portray East Asian characters indicates the character's "absolute Oriental Otherness;" the films were only successful as "the domain of white actors who impersonated heavily-accented masters of murder mysteries as well as purveyors of cryptic proverbs. Chan's character "embodies the stereotypes of Chinese Americans, particularly of males: smart, subservient, effeminate." Chan is representative of a model minority, the good stereotype that counters a bad stereotype: "Each stereotypical image is filled with contradictions: the bloodthirsty Indian is tempered with the image of the noble savage; the bandido exists along with the loyal sidekick; and Fu Manchu is offset by Charlie Chan." However, Fu Manchu's evil qualities are presented as inherently Chinese, while Charlie Chan's good qualities are exceptional; "Fu represents his race; his counterpart stands away from the other Asian Hawaiians."

Some argue that the character's popularity is dependent on its contrast with stereotypes of the Yellow Peril or Japanese people in particular. American opinion of China and Chinese-Americans grew more positive in the 1920s and '30s in contrast to the Japanese, who were increasingly viewed with suspicion. Sheng-mei Ma argues that the character is a psychological over-compensation to "rampant paranoia over the racial other."

In June 2003, the Fox Movie Channel cancelled a planned Charlie Chan Festival, soon after beginning restoration for cablecasting, after a special-interest group protested. Fox reversed its decision two months later, and on 13 September 2003, the first film in the festival was aired on Fox. The films, when broadcast on the Fox Movie Channel, were followed by round-table discussions by prominent East Asians in the American entertainment industry, led by George Takei, most of whom were against the films. Collections such as Frank Chin's Aiiieeee! An Anthology of Asian-American Writers and Jessica Hagedorn's Charlie Chan is Dead are put forth as alternatives to the Charlie Chan stereotype and "[articulate] cultural anger and exclusion as their animating force." Fox has released all of its extant Charlie Chan features on DVD, and Warner Bros. (the current proprietor of the Monogram library) has issued all of the Sidney Toler and Roland Winters Monogram features on DVD.

Modern critics, particularly Asian-Americans, continue to have mixed feelings on Charlie Chan. Fletcher Chan, a defender of the works, argues that the Chan of Biggers's novels is not subservient to white characters, citing The Chinese Parrot as an example; in this novel, Chan's eyes blaze with anger at racist remarks and in the end, after exposing the murderer, Chan remarks "Perhaps listening to a 'Chinaman' is no disgrace." In the films, both Charlie Chan in London (1934) and Charlie Chan in Paris (1935) "contain scenes in which Chan coolly and wittily dispatches other characters' racist remarks." Yunte Huang manifests an ambivalent attitude, stating that in the US, Chan "epitomizes the racist heritage and the creative genius of this nation's culture." Huang also suggests that critics of Charlie Chan may have themselves, at times, "caricatured" Chan himself.

Chan's character has also come under fire for "nuggets of fortune cookie Confucius" and the "counterfeit proverbs" which became so widespread in popular culture. The Biggers novels did not introduce the "Confucius say" proverbs, which were added in the films, but one novel features Chan remarking: "As all those who know me have learned to their distress, Chinese have proverbs to fit every possible situation." Huang Yunte gives as examples "Tongue often hang man quicker than rope," "Mind, like parachute, only function when open," and "Man who flirt with dynamite sometime fly with angels." He argues, however, that these "colorful aphorisms" display "amazing linguistic acrobatic skills." Like the "signifying monkey" of African-American folklore, Huang continues, Chan "imparts as much insult as wisdom."

Bibliography 

 Biggers, Earl Derr. The House Without a Key. New York: Bobbs-Merrill, 1925.
 —. The Chinese Parrot. New York: Bobbs-Merrill, 1926.
 —. Behind That Curtain. New York: Bobbs-Merrill, 1928.
 —. The Black Camel. New York: Bobbs-Merrill, 1929.
 —. Charlie Chan Carries On. New York: Bobbs-Merrill, 1930.
 —. Keeper of the Keys. New York: Bobbs-Merrill, 1932.
 Davis, Robert Hart. Charlie Chan in The Temple of the Golden Horde. 1974. Charlie Chan's Mystery Magazine. Reprinted by Wildside Press, 2003. .
 Lynds, Dennis. Charlie Chan Returns. New York: Bantam Books, 1974. ASIN B000CD3I22.
 Pronzini, Bill, and Jeffrey M. Wallmann. Charlie Chan in the Pawns of Death. 1974. Charlie Chan's Mystery Magazine. Reprinted by Borgo Press, 2003. .
 Avallone, Michael. Charlie Chan and the Curse of the Dragon Queen. New York: Pinnacle, 1981. .
 Robert Hart Davis. "The Silent Corpse". Feb.1974. "Charlie Chan's Mystery Magazine".
 Robert Hart Davis. "Walk Softly, Strangler". Nov. 1973. Charlie Chan's Mystery Magazine".
 Jon L. Breen. "The Fortune Cookie". May 1971. "Ellery Queen's Mystery Magazine".

Filmography
Unless otherwise noted, information is taken from Charles P. Mitchell's A Guide to Charlie Chan Films (1999).

American Western

Latin America

China

Notes

See also

Portrayal of East Asians in Hollywood
Mr. Wong

References 

 
 
 
 
 
 
 "Creating Charlie Chan" (22 March 1931). In Popular Culture (1975). Ed. by David Manning White. Ayer Publishing. .

External links 

 The "Charlie Chan" Novels
 Behind That Curtain
 Charlie Chan Carries On
 Keeper Of The Keys
 The Black Camel
 The Chinese Parrot
 The House Without A Key
 About Charlie Chan
 Charlie Chan Biography
 Charlie Chan fansite
 Public-domain Charlie Chan radio programs
 The Charlie Chan Family Home

 
1930s American radio programs
1938 comics debuts
1940s American radio programs
ABC radio programs
American comic strips
American film series
American radio dramas
Asian-American issues
 01
Charlton Comics titles
Comics characters introduced in 1938
Crestwood Publications titles
Crime film characters
Crime film series
DC Comics titles
Dell Comics titles
Detective radio shows
Chan, Charlie
Fictional characters based on real people
Chan, Charlie
Fictional Chinese American people
Fictional police detectives
Film series introduced in 1926
Literary characters introduced in 1919
Mass media franchises introduced in 1925
Mutual Broadcasting System programs
NBC Blue Network radio programs
Novels by Earl Derr Biggers
Race-related controversies in film
Race-related controversies in literature
Series of books
Stereotypes of Asian Americans
Stereotypes of East Asian people
 01